Erumely, also spelt "Erumeli" is a panchayat in the southeast part of Kottayam district in Kerala state, India. Erumely is situated 49 km east of Kottayam town and 133 km North of capital city Trivandrum. It is situated on the way to Sabarimala and also an important halting place (idathavalam) for the Sabarimala pilgrims. Erumely is famed for its religious harmony and prosperity between Hindus and Muslims which existed from the early periods. It is a place which have strong roots in legends and myths associated with lord Ayyappa. A new airport has been proposed in Erumeli. The village is nourished by Manimala River.

Etymology
Erumely is the name extracted from Erumakolli ("killed the buffalo"). A myth tells that Lord Ayyappa  killed "Mahishi" in this place on the way to collect a tiger's milk. Mahish means buffalo and "Eruma" in Malayalam and hence the name extract "erumakolli".

Location
Erumely is on the Kanjirappally - Pathanamthitta Route. A small river, Koratty (originally known as Manimala River), marks the entrance of Erumely town, which is exactly 14 km from Mundakayam, the gate of Highrange area. World Malayalee association has chosen Erumely as one of the three places in kottayam and pathanamthitta to set up the fifth airport in kerala and proposal is pending for approval. Cheruvally estate also provides a great experience.

Demographics
 India census, Erumely had a population of 43,437 in which 21199 are males and 22230 are females. Average sex ratio is 1049, which is lower than the state average of 1084. The literacy rate of males is 97.53% and 95.71% for females.

Administration
The panchayath of Erumely was formed on 15 August 1953. It spreads over an area of 82.36 km² with 40% of forest coverage. It is surrounded by Parathodu, Kanjirappally and Mundakkayam panchayaths in north, Chittar panchayath in east and south, Manimala, Chirakkadavu panchayaths in west. The panchayath is divided into 23 wards for its administrative convenience.

Wards in Erumely panchayath

Economy
The majority of the people are farmers (the town is surrounded by rubber tree plantations) or are in business.
Before it was a small town, now its undergoing developments, because of the temple, Masjid and its integrated, non-discriminatory society.

Important festivals

Erumely Pettathullal

The "Pettathullal" or ritual dance associated with the killing of the demoness Mahishi, hosted in the Malayalam months of Vrishikam and Dhanu (December and January) is the most noted festival in Erumely.

Chandanakkudam
This is another important festival which is conducted as a preliminary event to the historic pettathullal. The festival starts from the mosque with the "Malisa" procession.

Climate
The climate of Erumely is classified under Köppen. The place remains humid throughout the year with an annual temperature of 31 °C. Among the months, March and April are the hottest. The south west monsoon arrives from mid May to August providing significant amount of rainfall. The average annual rainfall here is 2620 mm. Winter normally starts from December to February.

Religions
Erumely is the gateway to Sabarimala. One of the important temples at Erumely is Sree Dharmashastha temple.
Vavar masjid is also located very near to Sree Dharmashastha temple. Assumption Forane church, under the Syro Malabar Catholic diocese of Kanjirapally, one of the major churches in Kottayam district, is also located here.

Places of worship

Sree Dharmasastha temple: This temple is located 0.5 km from Erumely town and it is commonly known as Valiyambalam. It is an important meeting place of Ayyappa devotees at times of Mandala - Makaravilakku period.

Petta Sree Dharmasastha temple: Petta Sastha temple is adjacent to the famous Vavar Masjid at Erumely. Lord Ayyappa presides here in the form of Pettayil Sastha.

Vavar Masjid: The masjid at Erumely dedicated to Vavarswami is the most noted landmark of the place. Every pilgrim who comes here visits the masjid to seek the blessings of Vavarswami.

Educational institutions
St. Thomas H.S.S, Devasom Board H.S.S, Vavar Memorial H.S.S, and MT High School are the well known higher secondary schools in Erumely. St. Thomas H.S.S started in 1937, and is under the Erumely Forane Church. MTHS Kanakappalam started in 1936. the oldest school in this area is MTHS, Kanakappalam Nirmala Public School, Shermount Public School are the schools without higher secondary studies.
MES College, on the way to Mukkoottuthara and Shermount College of Arts and Commerce which is located 2 km away from Erumely town. Both colleges are affiliated to Mahatma Gandhi University, Kottayam. Assissi Hospital and Nursing College is also at Mukkoottuthara. Amaljyothy Engineering College, under the Syro Malabar Catholic diocese of Kanjirapally, is in nearby Koovappally. Sree Sabareesa College is an Aided arts and science college is located at Murikkumvayal, Mundakayam. This college is located at Erumely district panchayath division. Sree Sabareesa college is the first aided college in India under a tribal management

Access

Road
Erumely can be approached through Mundakkayam, Kanjirappally, Manimala, Kanamala, Ponkunnam, Vechoochira, or Ranni. People coming from Kottayam can reach through Kanjirappally. People coming from Kochi can reach through  Thripunithura, Pala, Ponkunnam, Vizhikkithodu. People from the Highranges can access Erumely through Mundakkayam - Erumely state highway. From the capital city Trivandrum, Erumely is accessed through Ranni. 
NH220 National Highway passes 10 km near to Erumely through 26th mile, which makes it reachable easily.

Railway
Nearest Rail Heads are Kottayam, Chengannur, Changanassery, and Thiruvalla.

Airport
Cochin International Airport (119 km) and Thiruvananthapuram Airport (140 km) are the nearest airports.  Believers Church informed Pinarayi the consent to hand over land for Sabarigiri International airport. The airport at Cheruvally is approved by both governments and may expect to start soon.

On 19 July 2017, the Kerala Government has announced the construction of Airport at Cheruvally Estate of Harrisons Plantations near Erumely, to facilitate travel of Sabarimala pilgrims.

Proposed airport
State and central governments have approved an airport for Sabarimala and Cheruvally estate near Erumely is one among three sites. The other sites were government sites and whether Cheruvally is a government land or not will be announced by court in a year. The case is in court.  If implemented, it will be a green field airport with no industries or commercial building allowed with a huge radius of 50 km or more. The name of the proposed airport is Sabarigiri International Airport or shortened as "SABARI  AIRPORT".

Distances from various places
From Kottayam: 50 km
From Cochin : 98 km
From Kumily: 70 km
From Kanjirappally : 14 km
From Pala : 40 km
From Mundakkayam : 13.5 km
From Ranni : 18 km
From Angamoozhy : 28 km
From Alappuzha: 73 km
From Manimala: 17 km
From Thodupuzha: 63 km

Nearby places
 Mundakayam
 Ranni
 Thulappally
 Kanjirappally
 Kuruvamoozhy
 Chenappady
 Mukkoottuthara
 Ponkunnam
 Kanamala

See also
 Pettathullal

References

Villages in Kottayam district